Mullanurovo (Mullanur) is a rural locality (a village) in Staromatinsky Selsoviet, Bakalinsky District, Bashkortostan, Russia. The population was 121 as of 2010. There is 1 street.

Geography 
Mullanurovo is located 23 km northeast of Bakaly (the district's administrative centre) by road. Novye Maty is the nearest rural locality.

References 

Rural localities in Bakalinsky District